Piano, solo is a 2007 Italian drama film directed by Riccardo Milani. It is based on the book by Walter Veltroni Il disco del mondo - Vita breve di Luca Flores, musicista and it depicts real life events of  jazz pianist and composer Luca Flores (it).

Cast 
 Kim Rossi Stuart as Luca Flores
 Michele Placido as Giovanni 
 Jasmine Trinca as Cinzia
 Alba Rohrwacher as Marta 
 Mariella Valentini as Heidi
 Sandra Ceccarelli as Jolanda 
 Claudio Gioè as Alessandro 
 Roberto De Francesco as Raffaele
 Corso Salani as Pablo 
 Paola Cortellesi as Baba

References

External links

2007 films
Biographical films about musicians
Cultural depictions of jazz musicians
Films based on non-fiction books
2007 biographical drama films
Italian biographical drama films
Films directed by Riccardo Milani
2007 drama films
Cultural depictions of Italian men
2000s Italian-language films
2000s Italian films